Francesca Rognoni-Gratognini (Milan, October 1, 1850 – 1938) was an Italian painter, mainly of landscapes.

Biography

She was not formally trained in an academy. She married the manuscript illuminator Giuseppe Grassis. She was active in Milan mainly as a landscape as well as a still-life painter. In 1881 at the Exhibition of Fine Arts in Milan, she exhibited three landscapes depicting Principio di bufera, Bel giorno di novembre, and In autunno. In 1887 at Venice, she exhibited a landscape, painted al vero. In 1886, at Milan she displayed Un'Alba in novembre. In 1884 at Turin, she exhibited: Marina; un Autunno; and Capo di Portofino. Francesca Rognoni Gratognini (Milano, 1850–1938), pittrice di ottima famiglia milanese attivissima in quegli anni, che si era formata privatamente sotto la guida di Gian Battista Lelli, già suo insegnante in procedenza presso il Reale Collegio delle Fanciulle.

References

1850 births
Year of death missing
19th-century Italian painters
19th-century Italian women artists
Italian landscape painters
Italian women painters
Painters from Milan